Ursula Steiger is an Austrian para-alpine skier. She represented Austria at the 1976 Winter Paralympics and at the 1980 Winter Paralympics. In total she won one silver medal and three bronze medals in alpine skiing.

Achievements

See also 
 List of Paralympic medalists in alpine skiing

References

External links 
 

Living people
Year of birth missing (living people)
Place of birth missing (living people)
Paralympic alpine skiers of Austria
Alpine skiers at the 1976 Winter Paralympics
Alpine skiers at the 1980 Winter Paralympics
Medalists at the 1976 Winter Paralympics
Medalists at the 1980 Winter Paralympics
Paralympic bronze medalists for Austria
Paralympic silver medalists for Austria
Paralympic medalists in alpine skiing
Austrian female alpine skiers
20th-century Austrian women
21st-century Austrian women